Lophocharis is a genus of rotifers belonging to the family Mytilinidae.

The species of this genus are found in Eurasia.

Species:
 Lophocharis ambidentata De Ridder, 1960 
 Lophocharis curvata Berzinš, 1982

References

Rotifer genera
Ploima